"Here It Goes Again" is a song by American rock band OK Go, the fifth single released from their second studio album, Oh No (2005). It was the band's only single to chart on the US Billboard Hot 100 until "I Won't Let You Down" in November 2014 and peaked at number 36 on the UK Singles Chart, giving the band their second UK top-40 hit. The music video, featuring the band dancing on treadmills, became a staple on YouTube, at one time being one of their most watched videos with over 53 million views.

The single's B-side, "The Lovecats", is a cover of the song by the Cure and was previously included on the band's Do What You Want EP and the single "A Million Ways". An alternate version was nicknamed "UK Surf".

Composition and recording
Written by Damian Kulash Jr., the three-minute "Here It Goes Again" is set in common time at a "Moderately fast rock" tempo of 144 beats per minute. It is composed in the key of C major, with the vocal range spanning from C4 to A4. Kulash also sang and played the guitar in the original mix, which was produced by Tore Johansson with co-production done by Eric Drew Feldman, Howard Willing and Ken Sluiter. Andy Duncan was another guitarist on the track. Other instruments on the recording include drums performed by Dan Konopka and bass by Tim Nordwind. David Carlsson and Petter Lindgård were the song's engineers, with Jens Lindgård being the engineering assistant. Recorded at Gula Studion in Malmö, Sweden, it was mixed at The Village Recorder in Los Angeles by Dave Sardy, and finally mastered by Robert Vosgien at Capitol Mastering, also in Los Angeles.

Commercial performance
On the American Billboard Hot 100 chart, issue dated September 16, 2006, "Here It Goes Again" debuted at number 87, and by the next week it rose to its peak into the top 40 at 38. The track lasted a total of 20 weeks. Additionally, it reached into the top 40 onto the Pop 100 at number 34, as well as number 17 on the Adult Top 40 and Alternative Songs charts. "Here It Goes Again" was also a Top 40 hit in other countries. On the UK Singles Chart, it debuted at number 36, while on the Official New Zealand Music Chart its peak position was 28. In Australia, the song began at number 67 on the ARIA top 100 singles chart, and rose to 63 the next week and also topped the Hitseekers chart, which surveys tracks by bands that have not reached into the top 50 of the main chart.

Music video
The music video of this song is an elaborate performance of the band dancing on eight treadmills, arranged in two rows of four and in alternating opposite directions, in a single continuous take. Choreographed and co-directed by the band and lead singer Damian Kulash's sister Trish Sie, it took a total of seventeen attempts to complete the video. As in the band's video for "A Million Ways", Tim Nordwind lip-syncs the lead vocals instead of Damian Kulash, following the format from the dance choreographed for the song "C-C-C-Cinnamon Lips", which Tim sings. The video debuted on YouTube on July 31, 2006, and has been viewed over 60 million times. It premiered on VH1's Top 20 Countdown that same day. OK Go performed the dance routine live at the 2006 MTV Video Music Awards.

The music video won the 2007 Grammy Award for Best Short Form Music Video and the 2006 YouTube awards for Most Creative Video.

In "The Must List" on the August 18, 2006, issue of Entertainment Weekly, the video was ranked number nine: "The votes have been tallied, and this year's award for Best Use of Treadmills in an Alt-Pop Music Video goes to ... http://okgo.net/news.aspx". In July 2011, the music video was named one of "The 30 All-Time Best Music Videos" by Time magazine.

UK Surf Mix
During mid-2006, the band recorded a slower version of "Here It Goes Again" "in their attic". This version, dubbed "UK Surf" or the "UK Surf Mix", was released on iTunes in the UK the same day as the single. After being featured in the January 2007 Grey's Anatomy episode "Great Expectations", it was released in the US through iTunes on February 1, 2007, as a digital download.

Track listings

US promotional maxi-CD
 "Here It Goes Again" (Chris Lord-Alge edit)
 "Here It Goes Again" (Chris Lord-Alge full)
 "Here It Goes Again" (Dave Sardy album version)
 "Here It Goes Again" (video)

European single-side 7-inch single
 "Here It Goes Again" – 2:59

European and Australian CD single
 "Here It Goes Again" – 2:59
 "The Lovecats" – 3:31

New Zealand CD single
 "Here It Goes Again"
 "Here It Goes Again" (UK Surf)
 "Here It Goes Again" (video)

Credits and personnel
Credits are adapted from liner notes of the single release.

Locations
 Recorded at Gula Studion in Malmö, Sweden
 Mixed at The Village Recorder in Los Angeles, California 
 Mastered at Capitol Mastering in Los Angeles, California

Personnel

 Songwriting, vocals, guitar – Damian Kulash Jr.
 Production – Tore Johansson
 Co-production – Eric Drew Feldman, Howard Willing, Ken Sluiter
 Engineering – David Carlsson, Petter Lindgård
 Assistant engineering – Jens Lindgård
 Guitar – Andy Duncan
 Bass – Tim Nordwind
 Drums – Dan Konopka
 Mixing – Dave Sardy
 Mastering – Robert Vosgien

Charts

Certifications

Release history

In popular culture
According to MTV Games's Paul McGooyer, the video game Rock Band helped to spur further interest in the band. The E3 2016 trailer for Lego Dimensions features the song. This song featured in the NBC sitcom Scrubs in the sixth-season episode "My Mirror Image". Parodies of the video have appeared on The Simpsons, The Fairly OddParents, Foster's Home for Imaginary Friends, and Kuu Kuu Harajuku (created by Gwen Stefani).

References

2005 songs
2006 singles
2006 YouTube videos
Capitol Records singles
EMI Records singles
Grammy Award for Best Short Form Music Video
OK Go songs
Songs written by Damian Kulash